Best of the Badmen is a 1951 Western film directed by William D. Russell that is set in Missouri during the post-American Civil War period. It stars Robert Ryan, Claire Trevor and Robert Preston. It was a loose follow-up to Return of the Bad Men (1948).

Plot
The plot centres around the James-Younger Gang and their activities.

Jeff Clanton, an Army major from Missouri, captures the survivors of the Confederacy's Quantrill's Raiders and convinces them to give themselves up and pledge their allegiance to the Union. Clanton pledges that they will be paroled, but Matthew Fowler, a carpetbagger who owns a powerful detective agency, is determined to arrest them for the reward. When one of Fowler's deputies wounds one of the captives, return fire kills the deputy. Clanton is unjustly arrested for murdering Fowler's deputy. Clanton is tried by a kangaroo court and sentenced to be hanged the following morning. He escapes that night and then leads the band of outlaws including Jesse James and the Younger brothers in a vendetta against detective Matthew Fowler's detective agency.

Cast
Robert Ryan as Jeff Clanton
Claire Trevor as Lily
Jack Buetel as Bob Younger
Robert Preston as Matthew Fowler
Walter Brennan as 'Doc' Butcher
Bruce Cabot as Cole Younger
John Archer as Curley Ringo
Lawrence Tierney as Jesse James
Barton MacLane as Joad
Tom Tyler as Frank James
Robert J. Wilke as Jim Younger
John Cliff as John Younger
Lee MacGregor as Lieutenant Blaine
Emmett Lynn as Oscar
Carleton Young as Wilson

Production
Parts of the film were shot in Paria, Johnson Canyon, Strawberry Valley, the Gap, and Kanab Canyon in Utah.

References

External links

1951 films
1950s adventure drama films
1951 Western (genre) films
American adventure drama films
American Western (genre) films
1950s English-language films
Films directed by William D. Russell
Films produced by Samuel Bischoff
Films set in Missouri
Films set in the 1860s
RKO Pictures films
American Civil War films
Films shot in Utah
1951 drama films
Films scored by Paul Sawtell
1950s American films